Haworth is an impact crater that lies at the south pole of the Moon. The crater is named after British chemist Walter Haworth.

Formation
According to a 2015 study by Tye et al., Haworth was formed sometime during the Pre-Nectarian period, meaning it is at least 3.9 Ga (billion years) old.

Physical features
Due to Haworth's position near the lunar south pole, large amounts of the crater are permanently shadowed regions. These regions are very cold; many are believed to never reach temperatures above 40 Kelvin, making Haworth colder than nearby craters such as Shackleton and Faustini. Haworth and its surrounding low-lying areas are home to frost, which may be partly caused by these particularly low temperatures.

See also 

 Lunar south pole

References

External links 
 USGS: Earth's Moon

LQ30 quadrangle
Impact craters on the Moon